The 1988–89 Liga Leumit season began in September 1988 and ended in June 1989. After the first two rounds of matches (26 matches) the league split into two groups; a Championship group of six clubs and a Relegation group of eight clubs, who played the other clubs in their group once more.

Maccabi Haifa won their third title, whilst Hapoel Tiberias, Tzafririm Holon and Hapoel Tel Aviv (a year after winning the title) were all relegated. Benny Tabak of Maccabi Tel Aviv was the league's top scorer with 18 goals.

Regular season

Table

Results

Playoffs

Top playoff

Table

Results

Bottom playoff

Table

Results

References
Israel - List of Final Tables RSSSF

 

Liga Leumit seasons
Israel
1